Julio Martínez Cortés (born 2 November 2000) is a Spanish footballer who plays as a forward for Club Recreativo Granada.

Club career
Born in Requena, Valencian Community, Martínez joined Málaga CF's youth setup in 2018, after stints at Córdoba CF and Valencia CF. He made his senior debut with the reserves on 25 August 2019, starting and scoring the opener in a 4–0 Tercera División home routing of Alhaurín de la Torre CF.

On 15 December 2019, after scoring ten goals in only 15 matches for the B's, Martínez made his first team debut by coming on as a late substitute for Armando Sadiku in a 0–0 away draw against Extremadura UD in the Segunda División. On 6 July 2022, he moved to another reserve team, Club Recreativo Granada in Segunda Federación.

References

External links

2000 births
Living people
People from Requena-Utiel
Sportspeople from the Province of Valencia
Spanish footballers
Footballers from the Valencian Community
Association football midfielders
Segunda División players
Tercera División players
Atlético Malagueño players
Málaga CF players
Club Recreativo Granada players